The Sandra Schmirler Most Valuable Player Award is awarded to the top player in the playoff round of the annual Scotties Tournament of Hearts.  The winner is selected by members of the media, and is awarded at the victory banquet held after the final game of the bonspiel.  The top player at the tournament has been recognized since 1997, when Marcia Gudereit won the award.  After Sandra Schmirler's death at 36 due to cancer, the award was renamed starting in 2001.  The current holder of the Schmirler Award is Kerri Einarson of Team Canada.

Kerri Einarson has won the Schmirler Award four times, the most of any woman.  Colleen Jones, Kelly Scott, Jennifer Jones, Rachel Homan, and Chelsea Carey are the only other women who have won the award more than once.  Colleen Jones won all three of her MVP awards while playing as Team Canada.  Scott won the award once while representing her home province of British Columbia and the next year playing as Team Canada as the reigning champion, while Jennifer Jones won it while representing Manitoba in 2015 and 2018, and representing Team Canada in 2009.  Homan won her first MVP award after successfully defending her Scotties championship in 2014, then winning again representing Ontario in 2017.  Carey won both of her MVP awards while representing Alberta.  Einarson won her first MVP with her first Scotties title representing Manitoba in 2020, then defended both as Team Canada in 2021, 2022, and 2023.

Past winners

References

Curling trophies and awards
Canadian sports trophies and awards
Awards established in 1997
Scotties Tournament of Hearts
Women's curling in Canada
Most valuable player awards